Vojin Prole (born 16 April 1976) is a retired Serbian football goalkeeper.

In January 2001, Prole represented FR Yugoslavia at the Millennium Super Soccer Cup in India, as the team won the tournament. He made one appearance in the process, as a substitute against Bosnia and Herzegovina (2–0 win).

References

External links
 playerhistory.com
 Profile at Fudbalovytabor. 

Living people
1976 births
Footballers from Novi Sad
Serbian footballers
Serbian expatriate footballers
FK Vojvodina players
FK Železnik players
ŠK Slovan Bratislava players
Slovak Super Liga players
Expatriate footballers in Slovakia
Association football goalkeepers
Serbia and Montenegro international footballers
Serbian expatriate sportspeople in Slovakia